Bägby is a village with less than 50 inhabitants (2005) on the Swedish island of Öland. It lies next to the road 136. It belongs to the municipality Borgholm.

Populated places in Borgholm Municipality